George Stephenson's Birthplace is the 18th-century stone cottage home of rail pioneer George Stephenson.  Located along the north bank of the River Tyne in the village of Wylam, Northumberland, the cottage is owned by the National Trust and until recently it was open to the public as a historic house museum.  The house also featured exhibits about Stephenson's Rocket, an early steam locomotive. The Museum is no longer open to the public.

The House was built circa 1750 and is a Grade II* listed building. When George Stephenson was born, in 1781, there would have been four families living in this humble two storey cottage.

The house is accessible by bike and is a  walk from the nearest car park.

References

External links
 George Stephenson's Birthplace - National Trust
 Exploring Hadrian's Way - Stephenson's Track

Houses in Northumberland
Historic house museums in Northumberland
Biographical museums in Northumberland
National Trust properties in Northumberland
Railway museums in England
Grade II* listed buildings in Northumberland
Wylam